During the Parade of Nations at the 2018 Commonwealth Games opening ceremony, held on 4 April 2018, 71 athletes bearing the flags of their respective nations led their national delegations as they paraded into Carrara Stadium in the host city of Gold Coast, Australia.

Parade order
Following tradition, the host of the previous games, Scotland enters first, followed by the rest of the European countries competing. Following this, all countries parade in alphabetical order from their respective regions. After the European countries enter, countries from Africa, the Americas, Asia, the Caribbean, and lastly Oceania march in. The host nation of Australia enters last. Each nation was preceded by a placard bearer carrying a sign with the country's name.

A total of 39 male athletes carried their nation's flag, while 32 females did the same. Athletics was the most represented sport among the flag bearers, with 24 nations being led by track and field athletes.

Countries and flag bearers
Below is a list of parading countries and their announced flag bearer, in the same order as the parade. This is sortable by country name, flag bearer's name, or flag bearer's sport. Names are given in the form officially designated by the CGF.

References

Parade of Nations
Parades in Australia